was a Japanese gymnast and Olympic champion.

Olympics 
Katō competed at the 1968 Summer Olympics in Mexico City, Mexico, where he received a gold medal in team combined exercises, and a bronze medal in floor exercise.

World championships 
Katō received a silver medal in vault, and a bronze medal in pommel horse at the 1966 World Artistic Gymnastics Championships, and Japan won the team competition.

He received bronze medals in vault and floor exercise at the 1970 World Artistic Gymnastics Championships, and Japan again won the team competition.

His brother Sawao Katō was also a multiple Olympic medalist in artistic gymnastics.

References

External links

1942 births
1982 deaths
Japanese male artistic gymnasts
Gymnasts at the 1968 Summer Olympics
Olympic gymnasts of Japan
Olympic gold medalists for Japan
Olympic medalists in gymnastics
Medalists at the 1968 Summer Olympics
Medalists at the World Artistic Gymnastics Championships
Olympic bronze medalists for Japan
Universiade medalists in gymnastics
Universiade silver medalists for Japan
Medalists at the 1963 Summer Universiade
20th-century Japanese people